Banisia clathrula is a species of moth of the family Thyrididae. It is found in Mauritius and Réunion.

Its wingspan is around 35 mm.

See also
 List of moths of Réunion
 List of moths of Mauritius

References

External links

 Banisia clathrula at the Encyclopedia of Life

Thyrididae
Moths described in 1877
Moths of Mauritius
Moths of Réunion